Prestmoen is a village in the municipality of Stjørdal in Trøndelag county, Norway. The village is the location of Værnes Church.

References

Villages in Trøndelag
Stjørdal